Lee Suk-tae is a Justice of the Constitutional Court of Korea, nominated by Supreme Court chief Kim Myeong-soo and appointed by President Moon Jae-in in year 2018. He is also an member of Venice Commission representing South Korea, from 2019. He is regarded as liberal, left-wing group among nine Justices of the Constitutional Court. He is also a South Korean cause lawyer who fought for human rights.

Career 
Following list is summary of Lee Suk-tae's career.
1985		Lawyer, Lee Suk-tae Law Offices
1989		Lawyer, Duksu Joint Notarization and Law Offices
1997		Lawyer, Duksu Joint Law Offices
2000		Lawyer, Duksu Law Offices / Chairman, Human Rights Affairs Committee of Korean Bar Association
2003	    Secretary to the President for Public Offense Disciplines, Office of the President for Civil Service Discipline
2004		President, MINBYUN-Lawyers for a Democratic Society
2007		Non-executive Director, Korea Democracy Foundation
2008		Co-president, Civil Peace Forum
2011		Co-president, People's Solidarity for Participatory Democracy
2015		Chairman, Special Investigation Commission for 4. 16 Sewol Ferry Disaster
2017		Co-president, Truth and Justice Forum
2018		President, Public Interest & Human Rights Litigation Center of MINBYUN-Lawyers for a Democratic Society
2018  	    Justice of the Constitutional Court of Korea (Since 21 September 2018)

References

External links 

20th-century South Korean lawyers
Justices of the Constitutional Court of Korea
1953 births
Living people
21st-century South Korean judges
Seoul National University School of Law alumni